is a former Japanese footballer who played as a midfielder or forward.

Career
As a child he moved to Sydney Australia with his parents at age 10. He played for various Australian clubs before moving to Switzerland. He played in the first season of the A-League with the New Zealand Knights before returning to NSW state league football with Marconi Stallions.

In July 2007 he signed a contract with VfB Lübeck, a traditional club from Lübeck in the federal state of Schleswig-Holstein playing in the 3rd German Regionalliga Nord. He was released by the club after six months due to financial problems.

Coaching career
Imaya is now coaching football to young children in Japan and no longer pursuing a professional career.

References

External links
 Naoki Imana Interview
 naokis-castle 442

1980 births
Living people
Japanese footballers
Japanese expatriate footballers
Expatriate association footballers in New Zealand
Expatriate soccer players in Australia
Expatriate footballers in Switzerland
Expatriate footballers in Germany
Sportspeople from Tokyo
A-League Men players
National Soccer League (Australia) players
Swiss Super League players
Blacktown City FC players
Canberra Cosmos FC players
Marconi Stallions FC players
Neuchâtel Xamax FCS players
New Zealand Knights FC players
VfB Lübeck players
Association football forwards